American Epic: The Best of Lead Belly is a compilation of Lead Belly's first commercial recordings made in 1935 and released in 2017 to accompany the award-winning American Epic documentary film series. The album was released as a 14-track download and a vinyl LP.

Background 
During the production of the American Epic films, the sound department gained access to two collections of rare test pressings of Lead Belly's first professional recording sessions from 1935. Although Lead Belly was ultimately not featured in the final cut of the films, it was decided that these recordings were of such historical importance that they merited being transferred and restored using the new restoration techniques the American Epic film sound department had made in transferring and restoring the old shellac 78rpm discs for the film's soundtrack.

Compilation 
In January 1935, country music singer Tex Ritter introduced Lead Belly and his manager John Lomax to Art Satherley, a record producer and A&R man for the American Record Corporation (ARC). Between January and March 1935, Lead Belly recorded over forty songs for Satherley at the ARC studio at 1776 Broadway, New York. Only six of these titles were released at the time. The album collects fourteen of the unissued performances transferred from the test pressings made at the sessions. It includes autobiographical songs, like "Mr. Tom Hughes Town", in which Lead Belly recalls his teenage desire to visit the red-light district of Shreveport, Louisiana where Thomas Roland Hughes was the sheriff. In Lead Belly's 1936 biography the song was described as "the saddest and gayest of all Lead Belly's songs. It is his own ballad and his own estimate of the most important conflict of his life. He prophesies his destiny and at the same time accepts and defies it. The melody is that of a vulgar red-light song. The accompaniment is the swiftest, most intricate and exciting of his entire repertoire". The album includes 12-bar blues songs like "C.C. Rider", originally written and recorded by Ma Rainey and "Matchbox Blues" which was recorded in 1927 by his friend and busking partner Blind Lemon Jefferson and was subsequently recorded by Carl Perkins and The Beatles. It also features adaptations of 19th century Tin Pan Alley songs like "You Can't Lose Me, Charlie" by Harry S. Miller along with traditional folk songs like "Bull Cow" and "Shorty George", farming songs like "Ox Drivin' Blues" and romantic laments like "My Baby Quit Me" and "Baby Don't You Love Me No More". The performances constitute the earliest commercial recordings of one of the most important artists in the folk/blues genre.

Restoration 
New sound restoration techniques developed for the American Epic film series were utilized to restore the fourteen recordings on the album. The 78rpm record transfers were made by sound engineer Nicholas Bergh using reverse engineering techniques garnered from working with the restored first electrical sound recording system from the 1920s in The American Epic Sessions. This was followed by meticulous sound restoration on these 1920s recordings, by sound engineers Peter Henderson and Joel Tefteller, to reveal greater fidelity, presence, and clarity than had been heard before.

Release 
The album was released on June 16, 2017, one month after the US broadcast of American Epic. The album was issued as a download by Sony Legacy and a vinyl LP by Third Man Records.

Critical reception 
The Village Voice described the sound as "re-mastering I can only call profound. Performances you might think you knew sound as if you've never heard them before — never apprehended them." Ian Anderson in fRoots said "you haven't really heard these tracks at all. Not like this. Forget bad dubs of worn-out 78s pressed on poor vinyl. The 'reverse engineering' transfers by Nicholas Bergh and subsequent restorations are so startlingly better, practically everything you will ever have experienced from this era can be discounted. And there's none of that fog of 78 surface noise which many people find too much of a distraction: suddenly, legendary artists are in the room with you."

Track listing

Personnel 

 Lead Belly - vocals and guitar
 Bernard MacMahon - editor, compiler, producer
 Nicholas Bergh - 78rpm transfers, mastering
 Peter Henderson - restoration, mastering, producer
 Duke Erikson - restoration, mastering, producer
 Joel Tefteller - restoration, mastering, compiler
 John Polito - mastering
 Ellis Burman - mastering
 Allison McGourty - producer
 Adam Block - producer
 Patrick Ferris - associate producer
 Jack McLean - associate producer
 Nat Strimpopulos - artwork

References

Notes

Bibliography 

 Filene, Benjamin. Romancing the Folk: Public Memory & American Roots Music. North Carolina: University of North Carolina Press, 2000. 
 Lomax, John A. & Lomax, Alan. Negro Folk Songs as Sung by Lead Belly "King of the Twelve-string Guitar Players of the World," Long-time Convict in the Penitentiaries of Texas and Louisiana. New York: The MacMillan Company, 1936.
 Gracyk, Theodore. I Wanna Be Me: Rock Music And The Politics Of Identity. Pennsylvania: Temple University Press, 2001. 
 Wald, Elijah & McGourty, Allison & MacMahon, Bernard. American Epic: The First Time America Heard Itself. New York: Touchstone, 2017.  .

External links 
 Official American Epic website

Folk albums by American artists
2017 compilation albums
Folk compilation albums
Compilation albums by American artists
Blues compilation albums
American Epic albums
Third Man Records compilation albums
Legacy Recordings compilation albums
LO-MAX Records albums